The Joe Shuster Canadian Comic Book Creator Awards (or Joe Shuster Awards) are given out annually for outstanding achievements in the creation of comic books, graphic novels, webcomics, and comics retailers and publishers by Canadians.  The awards, first handed out in April 2005, are named in honour of Joe Shuster (1914–1992), the Canadian-born co-creator of Superman.

The Canadian Comic Book Creator Awards Association is a not-for-profit organization formed in 2004 to administer the awards.

Overview
The Joe Shuster Awards are comic book industry-oriented awards that recognize the achievements of Canadian citizens and permanent residents. Founded initially as an English-language comics award, the criteria have been changed and refined since 2006 to be inclusive of all works published in Canada (see Language criteria). The majority of the awards were initially committee-nominated, public-vote awards, with write-in nominations accepted for the International Creator award. This was changed in 2008 to a committee-nominated, jury-selected model, with publishers nominating works within the relevant award category. The model established in 2008 was designed to eliminate voter bias and ballot stuffing. The jury deliberates until they agree on a winner, discussing the merits of each candidate.

They are named after Canadian-born cartoonist Joe Shuster (1914–1992), who co-created Superman in 1938.  The award, which focuses on professionally published and distributed comics from all publishers including those designated as mainstream such as DC Comics and Marvel Comics, is complemented by the Doug Wright Awards, which focuses on alternative comics, cartooning, and comic strips and avoid mainstream published works.

From the Joe Shuster Award website: "When it comes to defining comics our job is to be as INCLUSIVE as possible when narrowing the selections down to an EXCLUSIVE number of annual nominees – there is only one winner in each category though! We strive to ensure that our nominates represent the entire country's output – whether that output is in English or French (Canada's two official languages) or in other languages – the central defining characteristic of our nominees are that they are Canadian. We don't censure Canadian creators who work with non-Canadian publishing houses – while Canada is a large and diverse country, for the creative awards, there are a very limited number of Canadian publishers."

Harry Kremer Retailer Award
The late Harry Kremer, owner of Now & Then Books in Kitchener-Waterloo, Ontario, was a true pioneer in the industry and a constant and tireless promoter and patron of the medium and owner one of the first comic book specialty stores in Canada. His memory is kept alive in the award that has been named after him – the Outstanding Canadian Comic Book Retailer Award. The Award was given to Kremer's store in 2005, with open voting from 2006 onwards.

Gene Day Self-Publisher Award
Named after the late comics artist and self-publisher Gene Day (1951–1982), this award honours Canadian comic book creators or creative teams who self-published their work, but did not have the books distributed by a third-party distributor. The award winner receives a bursary of $500. The award was introduced in 2009.  Prior to this, Dave Sim had established the Howard E. Day Prize distributed annually at the Small Press and Alternative Comics Expo in Columbus, Ohio, from 2002 to 2008.

Comics For Kids Award
This award was established in 2004. Works considered for this award are comic books and graphic novels that are targeted at readers 14 and under. Nominees are selected by a team of educators led by Jennifer Haines, MA, B.Ed., who is also the proprietor of Guelph, Ontario's The Dragon comic book shop.

Canadian Comic Book Creator Hall of Fame

The Hall of Fame includes dozens of creators such as Hal Foster, Win Mortimer, John Byrne, Dave Sim and more.

Language criteria

The Joe Shuster Awards honour original work published during the previous calendar year in any language. However, Canada has two official languages – French and English, so extra research and attention is given to works published in the two official languages. In order to ensure that bilingual works are included on the ballot, two nominating committees select the finalists in each official language and the finalists are merged for the announced ballot. The nominated books are then given to jury members who can read both official languages for equal consideration.

Citizenship and residency

The Joe Shuster Awards are open to all Canadian citizens.

Canadian citizens who have chosen to reside outside of Canada are still eligible for consideration, unless they contact the Awards organization and notify them that they have surrendered their Canadian citizenship and no longer wish to be considered for their recent work as a Canadian citizen.

Non-Canadians who have achieved permanent residency status in Canada are also eligible for consideration. In order to be considered for inclusion as a resident, the individual must have lived in Canada for three years. Permanent residents who do not wish to be considered may opt out of the Awards program before the selection process begins by sending a statement in writing to the Awards organization. If an approved permanent resident moves away from Canada, they are no longer considered eligible for the awards.

Categories

Categories and winners of Joe Shuster Awards are as follows:

Outstanding Achievement
2005 Dave Sim and Gerhard for completing Cerebus in 2004. Begun in 1977, this 300-issue series is a milestone in comic book publishing and is the longest running creator-owned comic book series.
 2006-2007 No winner
 2008 David Watkins for using comic books as a teaching tool.
 2009 Category suspended

Outstanding Artist
 2005 Kaare Andrews for Spider-Man/Doctor Octopus: Year One (published by Marvel Comics)
 2006 Pia Guerra for Y: The Last Man (published by DC Comics/Vertigo) and a story in Spider-Man Unlimited #10 (published by Marvel Comics)
 2007 Darwyn Cooke and J. Bone for Batman/The Spirit #1 (published by DC Comics).
 2008 Dale Eaglesham for Justice Society of America #2-4, 6–7, 9-11 (DC Comics)
 2009 David Finch for Ultimatum #1-2
 2010 Stuart Immonen for Ultimate Spider-Man 130-133, New Avengers 55-60, Fantastic Four 569 (Marvel), The CBLDF Presents Liberty Comics 2 – "Trampoline Hall" (Image Comics)
 2011 Francis Manapul for Adventure Comics#6, The Flash #1-6, Superman/Batman #75 (DC Comics)
 2012 Stuart Immonen for "Fear Itself #1-7; "Queen, King, Off-Suit"/X-Men: To Serve and Protect #4;  "Say You're Dead"/Outlaw Territory Volume 2
 2013 Isabelle Arsenault for "Jane, le renard & moi" a.k.a. Jane, the Fox & I 
 2014 Fiona Staples for Saga 9-17 (published by Image)
 2015 Adrian Alphona for Ms. Marvel (published by Marvel Comics) 
 2016 Steve Skroce for We Stand on Guard (published by Image Comics)
 2017 Yanick Paquette and Nathan Fairbairn for Wonder Woman: Earth One (published by DC Comics)
 2018 Stuart Immonen for Amazing Spiderman 25-31, 789, Marvel Legacy 1 (published by Marvel Comics), Empress 7 (published by Icon/Marvel Comics)

Outstanding Cartoonist (writer and artist)
 2005 Darwyn Cooke for DC: The New Frontier (published by DC Comics)
 2006 Bryan Lee O'Malley for Scott Pilgrim Vol. 2 (published by Oni Press)
 2007 Darwyn Cooke for The Spirit #1 (published by DC Comics).
 2008 Jeff Lemire for Essex County Vol. 1: Tales From The Farm, Essex County Vol. 2: Ghost Stories (Top Shelf)
 2009 Dave Sim for Glamourpuss #1-4 and Judenhass
 2010 Michel Rabagliati for Paul, tome 06: Paul à Québec (La Pastèque)
 2011 Tin Can Forest for Baba Yaga and the Wolf (Koyama Press)
 2012 Ramon K. Pérez for Jim Henson's Tale of Sand
 2013 Jeff Lemire for The Underwater Welder and Sweet Tooth 
 2014 Zviane (Sylvie-Anne Ménard) for Les deuxièmes (published by Pow Pow)
 2015 Bryan Lee O'Malley for Seconds – A Graphic Novel (Published by Random House Canada)
 2016 Jillian Tamaki for Supermutant Magic Academy (published by Drawn & Quarterly)
 2017 Guy Delisle for "S’enfuir, récit d’un otage" aka Hostage (Published by Dargaud)
 2018 Jeff Lemire for Roughneck (published by Gallery 13), Royal City 1-8 (published by Image Comics)

Outstanding Publisher
 2005 Arcana Studio
 2006 Drawn & Quarterly
 2007 Drawn & Quarterly
 2008 Drawn & Quarterly
 2009 Les 400 coups / Mécanique Générale
 2010 La Pastèque
 2011 Koyama Press
 2012 Category suspended

Outstanding Writer
 2005 (tie) Samm Barnes for Doctor Spectrum (published by Marvel Comics)
 2005 (tie) Ty Templeton for The Batman Adventures (published by DC Comics)
 2006 J. Torres for Batman: Legends of the Dark Knight and Teen Titans Go! (published by DC Comics), and Love As a Foreign Language (published by Oni Press)
 2007 Darwyn Cooke for Superman Confidential #1-2 (published by DC Comics).
 2008 Cecil Castellucci for The P.L.A.I.N. Janes (DC/Minx)
 2009 Mariko Tamaki for Skim (Groundwood Books) and Emiko Superstar (DC/Minx)
 2010 Maryse Dubuc for Les Nombrils 4: Duels de belles (Dupuis)
 2011 Emilie Villeneuve for La fille invisible (Glénat Québec)
 2012 Kurtis J. Wiebe for The Green Wake #1-8; The Intrepids #1-6; "Logan's Lost Lesson"/Marvel Holiday Special 2011
 2013 Fanny Britt for Jane, le renard & moi a.k.a. Jane, the Fox & Me 
 2014 Kurtis Wiebe for Rat Queens, Peter Panzerfaust, Dia De Los Muertos. Lonesome (published by Image)
 2015 Mariko Tamaki for This One Summer (published by Groundwood Books)
 2016 Jeff Lemire for Justice League United (published by DC Comics), Descender, Plutona (published by Image Comics), All-New Hawkeye. Extraordinary X-Men (published by Marvel Comics), Book of Death: Fall of Bloodshot. Bloodshot Reborn (published by Valiant)
 2017 Jeff Lemire for Black Hammer (Published by Dark Horse Comics), Descender, Plutona (Published by Image Comics),  All-New Hawkeye, All-New X-Men, Moon Knight, Old Man Logan, Extraordinary X-Men (Published by Marvel Comics), Bloodshot Reborn,Bloodshot U.S.A., 4001 A.D.: Bloodshot (Published by Valiant)
 2018 Jim Zub for Avengers 1.MU, Secret Empire United 1, Thunderbolts 7-12, Uncanny Avengers 25-28, Zombies Assemble 1-3, 0, Zombies Assemble 2 1-2 (with Yusako Komiyama) (published by Marvel Comics), Glitterbomb: The Fame Game 1-4, Wayward 21-25 (published by Image Comics), Dungeons & Dragons: Frost Giant's Fury 3-5 (IDW) Freelance 1-4 (with Andrew Wheeler) (published by Chapterhouse)

Outstanding WebComic Creator/Creative Team
 2007 Dan Kim, for April & May & June, Kanami & Penny Tribute
 2008 Ryan Sohmer & Lar deSouza, for Looking for Group & Least I Could Do
 2009 Cameron Stewart for Sin Titulo
 2010 Karl Kerschl for The Abominable Charles Christopher
 2011 Emily Carroll for His Face All Red and more
 2012 Emily Carroll for various comics, 2011
 2013 Michael DeForge for Ant Comic 
 2014 Jayd Aït-Kaci (with Christina Strain) for The Fox Sister
 2015 Nicole Chartrand for Fey Winds: A Fantasy Webcomic
 2016 Category on Hiatus 
 2017 Ty Templeton for Bun Toons
 2018 Gisèle Lagacé and David Lumsdon for Ménage à 3

Outstanding Colourist
 2008 Dave McCaig for Nextwave, Agents of H.A.T.E. #12, New Avengers #27-35, Fallen Son: The Death of Captain America #1: Wolverine, Marvel Comics Presents #1-4, Wolverine #50, Avengers Classic #7 (Marvel Comics) DC Infinite Halloween Special #1 (DC Comics), The Other Side #4-5 (DC/Vertigo) Stephen Colbert’s Tek Jansen #1 (Oni Press)
 2009 François Lapierre for "Gédéon et la bête du lac" Contes et légendes du Québec (Glénat Québec), Magasin général 4 (Casterman)
 2010 Nathan Fairbairn for The Amazing Spider-Man #605, Dark Reign: The List – X-Men #1, Dark X-Men: The Confession #1 (Cover), Guardians of the Galaxy #16, 18-19, House of M: Masters of Evil #1, Marvel Mystery Comics 70th Anniversary Special #1, Nation X #1, Realm of Kings: Imperial Guard #1-2, Timestorm 2009–2099: Spider-Man, War of Kings: Warriors #2, Wolverine #72, Wolverine: Origins #32, Wolverine: Weapon X #6-8, X-Factor #39-50, 200 (Variant) (Cover), X-Factor #45, X-Men: Kingbreaker #2-4, X-Men Origins: Gambit #1 (Marvel Comics), Stephen Colbert's Tek Jansen #4-5 (Oni Press)
 2011 Julie Rocheleau for La fille invisible (Glénat Québec)
 2012 Category suspended

Outstanding Cover (2008-2010) / Cover Artist (2011-)
 2008 Steve Skroce for Doc Frankenstein #6 (Burleyman)
 2009 Niko Henrichon for Hostile Tome 1: Impact (Dupuis)
 2010 Darwyn Cooke for Richard Stark's Parker: The Hunter (IDW)
 2011 Fiona Staples
 2012 François Lapierre for Chroniques Sauvages
 2013 Mike del Mundo
 2014 Julie Rocheleau for La colère de Fantômas tome 1: Les Bois de justice (published by Dargaud)
 2015 Darwyn Cooke
 2016 Category on Hiatus
 2017 Michael Cho
 2018 Djibril Morissette-Phan

Comics for Kids Award (The Dragon Award) 
 2009 Jellaby Book 1 by Kean Soo 
 2010 Nightschool: The Weirn Books Vols.1-2 (Yen Press) by Svetlana Chmakova
 2011 Three Thieves Book One: Tower of Treasure (Kids Can Press) by Scott Chantler
 2012 Ariane et Nicolas Tome 6: Les Toiles Mysterieuses by Paul Roux
 2013 Cat's Cradle Volume 1: The Golden Twine by Joe Rioux
 2014 Couettes tome 2: Bidou and tome 3: Adopte-moi ! by Séverine Gauthier (writer) and MiniKim (Maïté Lajic, artist) (published by Dargaud)
 2015 Agent Jean! tome 6 et 7, by Alex A., (Published by Presses Aventure)
 2016 Awkward by Svetlana Chmakova (Published by Yen Press)
 2017 Bera the One-Headed Troll by Eric Orchard (published by :01 First Second)

Gene Day Award for Canadian Self-Publishing (New in 2009)
 2009 Jesse Jacobs for Blue Winter, Shapes in the Snow
 2010 Ethan Rilly for Pope Hats No.1
 2011 John Martz for Heaven All Day
 2012 Dakota McFadzean for Ghost Rabbit
 2013 Cory McCallum and Matthew Daley - The Pig Sleep: A Mr. Monitor Case
 2014 Steven Gilbert for The Journal of the Main Street Secret Lodge
 2015 James Edward Clark for Evil #3
 2016 Cloudscape Comics Collective for Epic Canadiana
 2017 Nunumi for Sky Rover

Harry Kremer Retailer Award
 2005 Now & Then Books (Kitchener, Ontario)
 2006 Strange Adventures (Halifax, Nova Scotia)
 2007 Happy Harbor (Edmonton, Alberta)
 2008 Big B Comics (Hamilton, Ontario)
 2009 Legends Comics and Books (Victoria, British Columbia)
 2010 The Beguiling (Toronto, Ontario)
 2011 Planète BD (Montréal, Quebec)
 2012 Silver Snail (Toronto, Ontario)
 2013 Heroes Comics (London, Ontario)
 2014 The Comic Shop (Vancouver, British Columbia)
 2015 Amazing Stories (Saskatoon, Saskatchewan)
 2016 Another Dimension (Calgary, Alberta)
 2017 L'imaginaire (Laurier, Quebec)

T.M. Maple Award
New in 2014. "The T. M. Maple Award will go to someone (living or deceased) selected from the Canadian comics community for achievements made outside of the creative and retail categories who have had a positive impact on the community."
 2014 T.M. Maple aka Jim Burke (1956-1994)
 2014 Debra Jane Shelly (1974-2014)
 2015 Michael Hirsh (1948-)
 2015 Patrick Loubert (1947-)
 2015 Robert Charpentier (1960-2015)
 2016 John Bell (1952-)
 2017 Kenneth Ketter

Hall of Fame Inductees
 2005 Joe Shuster (1914–1992)
 2005 Leo Bachle (a.k.a. Les Barker) (1926–2003)
 2005 Adrian Dingle (1911–1974)
 2005 Hal Foster (1892–1982)
 2005 Ed Furness (1911–2005)
 2005 Rand Holmes (1942–2002)
 2006 Jon St. Ables (1912–1999)
 2006 Owen McCarron (1929–2005)
 2006 Win Mortimer (1919–1998)
 2006 Dave Sim (1956–)
 2007 Albert Chartier (1912–2004)
 2007 Gerald Lazare (1927–)
 2007 Jacques Hurtubise (Zyx) (1950–)
 2007 Gene Day (1951–1982)
 2008 Ted McCall (1901–1975)
 2008 Pierre Fournier (1949–)
 2008 Stanley Berneche (1947–)
 2008 John Byrne (1950–)
 2009 George Menendez Rae (1906–1992)
 2009 Réal Godbout (1951–)
 2009 Ken Steacy (1955–)
 2009 Diana Schutz (1955–)
 2010 Dave Darrigo (1954–)
 2010 Serge Gaboury (1954–)
 2010 Deni Loubert (1951–)
 2010 Richard Comely (1950–) in celebration of the 35th Anniversary of Captain Canuck 1
 2010 George Freeman (1951-) in celebration of the 35th Anniversary of Captain Canuck 1
 2010 Claude St. Aubin (1951–) in celebration of the 35th Anniversary of Captain Canuck 1
 2011 Chester Brown (1960–)
 2011 Todd McFarlane (1961–)
 2012 No Hall of Fame Inductees
 2013 Vernon Miller (comics)  (1912–1974)
 2013 Murray Karn  (1924–)
 2013 Arn Saba now known as Katherine Collins (1947–)
 2014 Cy Bell (1904–197?)
 2014 Edmond Good (1910–1991)
 2014 Ty Templeton (1962–)
 2015 Doris Slater (1918-1964)
 2015 James Waley (1954-)
 2016 Tedd Steele (1922-1994)
 2016 Ley aka Shirley Fortune (1921-1998)
 2016 Fred Kelly (1921-2005)
 2016 Mark Shainblum (1963-)
 2016 Darwyn Cooke (1962-2016)
 2017 Jack Tremblay (1926-)
 2017 Gabriel Morrissette (1959-)
 2017 Lovern Kindzierski (1964-)
 2017 Julie Doucet (1965-)
 2017 Stuart Immonen
 2018 Sid Barron (1917-2006)
 2018 Jacques Goldstyn aka Boris (1958-)
 2018 David Boswell (1953-)
 2018 Tom Grummett (1959-)
 2019 Al Hewetson (1946-2004)
 2019 Dale Keown (1962-)
 2019 Ken Lashley (1967-)
 2019 Gerhard (1959-)

Voters Choice - Outstanding International Creator
 2006 Brian K. Vaughan for Runaways (published by Marvel Comics), Ex Machina, and Y: The Last Man (published by DC Comics/Vertigo)
 2007 Brian K. Vaughan for Runaways and Doctor Strange: The Oath (published by Marvel Comics), Pride of Baghdad, Ex Machina, and Y: The Last Man (published by DC Comics/Vertigo)
 2008 Ed Brubaker for Captain America, Criminal, Immortal Iron Fist and Uncanny X-Men (Marvel Comics)
 2009 Category suspended

Voters Choice - Favourite Creator (English Language)
 2007 Dan Kim for April & May & June, Kanami & Penny Tribute.
 2008 Faith Erin Hicks for Zombies Calling 2009 Category suspended

Voters Choice - Favourite Creator (French Language)
 2007 Michel Rabagliati for Paul a la Pêche, published by La Pastèque.
 2008 Philippe Girard for Danger Public''
 2009 Category suspended

See also

Doug Wright Award
Canadian Cartoonist Hall of Fame

References

Works cited

External links
 
 Interview with Kevin Boyd about the awards
 Jamie Coville's audio recordings of the 2nd (2006), 3rd (2007), 4th (2008), 5th (2009) and 6th (2010) Annual Awards
 Jamie Coville covers the 1st (2005), 2nd (2006) and 3rd (2007) Awards Ceremony for the Collector Times
 The Fabler Blog looks at the 2010 Nominees
 Metro Columnist Jonathan Kuehlein's article on the 2008 Awards ceremony
 4th Annual JSA's Completed!
 Blake Bell covers the 2007 Awards Ceremony
 Metro columnist & CCBCAA member Jonathan Kuehlein's article on the 2007 Awards ceremony
 Canadian comic-book awards: one down, one to go CBC Arts report on the 1st year

2005 establishments in Canada
Awards established in 2005
Joe Shuster